Dorothy G. Downie (1894–1960) was a Scottish botanist and forester. She is known for her research on the fungal symbionts and nutritional requirements of orchids.

Biography 
Dorothy G. Downie graduated from the University of Edinburgh in 1917 with a B.S. in science and in 1919 with a B.S. in forestry. She was the first woman to receive a degree in forestry from the University of Edinburgh. From 1919 to 1920 she studied at Moray House Training College, where she qualified in professional training for teachers. From 1920 to 1925 she worked at the University of Aberdeen as an assistant to William Grant Craib.

In 1925 she received a Carnegie scholarship and became a graduate student at the University of Chicago. There she received in 1928 a PhD in botany with a dissertation on the morphology of the male gametophyte of Microcycas calocoma. In 1927 she went to Cuba, where she collected cycads by riding on horseback through the Cordillera de Guaniguanico.

At the University of Aberdeen, Downie worked as an assistant from 1928 to 1929, a lecturer from 1929 to 1949, and a reader from 1949 to 1960. In 1960 she retired due to a progressive disease and died in August of that year.

Selected publications

References

1894 births
1960 deaths
Alumni of the University of Edinburgh
University of Chicago alumni
Academics of the University of Aberdeen
20th-century British botanists
British women botanists